Dongargaon is a town and municipality (Nagar panchayat) located within the Rajnandgaon district, within Chhattisgarh, India.

Geography
Dongargaon is located at the coordinates . It has an average elevation of 304 metres (997 feet) above sea level.

Demographics and key issues
As of the 2001 India census, Dongargaon was recorded to have a population of 11,571 people. Males constituted 51% of the total population while females constituted 49%. Dongargaon,Chhattisgarh has a literacy rate of 78%, which is higher than the overall national average of 74%. Within Dongargaon,Chhattisgarh, 14% of the population is under the age of 6.

67% of the Dongargaon,Chhattisgarh population work within the agricultural sector, 12% are employed by the government, 15% are employed by the private sector and 5% are employed by family-owned businesses.

References

Cities and towns in Rajnandgaon district